The 1962–63 DFB-Pokal was the 20th season of the annual German football cup competition. It began on 1 June 1963 and ended on 14 August 1963. 16 teams competed in the tournament of four rounds. In the final Hamburg defeated Borussia Dortmund 3–0.

Matches

Round of 16

Replay

Quarter-finals

Semi-finals

Final

References

External links
 Official site of the DFB 
 Kicker.de 
 1963 results at Fussballdaten.de 
 1963 results at Weltfussball.de 

1962-63
1962–63 in German football cups